John N. Avery (February 16, 1913 – January 10, 1977)  was an American baseball pitcher in the Negro leagues. He played with the New York Black Yankees in 1946, 1947 and 1948. 


Early life and career
Prior to his Negro league career, Avery pitched for the Colored All-Stars of Plainfield, New Jersey in 1936, and for the Marino A.C. of Plainfield from 1941 through 1942. During the latter season, he also played second base in at least one game.<ref>Courier News staff (August 3, 1942). "Marinos Win Over Stars, 10-2". The Courier News. p. 13. Retrieved October 30, 2021.</ref>

In 1954, Avery managed the Plainfield Barons of the City Twilight Baseball League.

References

Further reading
 Govlick, George (June 12, 1954). "Motormen Beat Barons, Tie Dreiers for Lead". Plainfield Courier-News. p. 10
 Wiggins, E.T., photo (October 20, 1960). "NPHS Dedicates Memorial Flagpole; Dedicate Flag Pole". Plainfield Courier-News. p. 21
 Sweeney, Mike (June 13, 1972). "Vandalism on increase, boro school head says". The Plainfield Courier-News''. p. 17

External links
 and Seamheads 

1913 births
1977 deaths
Baseball players from New Jersey
New York Black Yankees players
African-American baseball managers